Alegria National High School (ANHS) is an academic institution in Surigao del Norte. It is located at Barangay Don Julio Ouano, Alegria, Surigao del Norte. The ANHS established in 1966 which begun as Barangay High School. It became Municipal High School in the 1980s and later became a National High School in the 1990s.

External links
Municipality of Alegria Website Blog
ALEGRIA TODAY
Alegria National High School

High schools in the Philippines
Schools in Surigao del Norte
1966 establishments in the Philippines
Educational institutions established in 1966